The Prophet, originally written in English by Kahlil Gibran and first published in the United States in 1923, has been translated into several languages.

References

1923 poetry books
Books by Kahlil Gibran
Prophet
Translation-related lists